is a Japanese video game company affiliated with Game Freak, Nintendo and The Pokémon Company, and one of the owners of the Pokémon franchise. It was founded by Tsunekazu Ishihara in November 1995, with the assistance of then-president of HAL Laboratory, Satoru Iwata, as a successor to Shigesato Itoi's company Ape Inc. 

It is best known for creating and working in the Pokémon Trading Card Game and designing Pokémon toys. In addition to that, Creatures Inc has a studio known as the Pokémon CG Studio. This studio focuses on the 3D modelling and animation of the Pokémon models in all Pokémon games; main series and spin-offs. Finally, in addition to that, they also develop their own Pokémon spin-off titles and various non-Pokémon titles.

Its current president is Hirokazu Tanaka, a former Nintendo composer and sound designer. The company has its headquarters in Chiyoda, Tokyo, in proximity to Ichigaya Station.

History

1989–1995: Ape Inc. 
Ape Inc. was founded in March 1989 with Shigesato Itoi as its chief executive officer (CEO). Nintendo president Hiroshi Yamauchi had wanted to support new talent in game design. Liking Itoi's work, he proposed the idea of the company to Itoi and invested in it. Ape's staff included Tsunekazu Ishihara, who later became the Pokémon Company's CEO, and Ashura Benimaru Itoh, a renowned illustrator. They began working on Mother, which was released on 27 July 1989. Its music was composed by Hirokazu Tanaka, who later became the second CEO of Creatures. The team went on to develop Mother 2, which would be known in the Western world as EarthBound. When development of this game began to falter, Satoru Iwata of HAL Laboratory was brought in to help the project. The game was released in Japan on 27 August 1994. Ape's game development activities ceased in 1995. Ape also produced a line of official guidebooks for Nintendo, in co-operation with Nintendo and Shogakukan. They began with Encyclopedia Mother in October 1989, and ended with Nintendo Official Guidebook—Pocket Monsters: Red, Green, Blue (Complete Compatibility, Revised Edition) on 10 January 1997. Shogakukan assumed Ape's role and continues to produce Nintendo Official Guidebooks in their stead.

1995–present: Creatures Inc. 
Creatures Inc. was established on 8 November 1995, with Tsunekazu Ishihara as CEO, and consisting of former staff from Ape.

Pokémon CG Studio is a division of Creatures that is dedicated solely to making Pokémon 3D models and animations. They only make the models and animations for the pokemon themselves, as human characters are modeled and animated in-house at Game Freak. The studio as of 2017 had 22 full time 3DGC artists, however according to studio director Atsuko Ujiya they wanted to double it in the following years. She states that during its peak workload they have around 100 employees (including temporary contractors) to work on the creation of models and animations.

On 16 October 2020, Creatures announced the acquisition of Ambrella, the developer of a number of Pokémon spin-off games. Creatures acquired all property rights of Ambrella, and Ambrella disbanded, with its employees becoming part of Creatures.

Games 
Ape/Creatures has developed or has contributed to the development of the following games.

Ape

Creatures

Canceled

Footnotes

References

External links 
 Official website, Japanese
 Official website, English

Japanese companies established in 1995
Toy companies established in 1995
Toy companies of Japan
Video game companies established in 1995
Video game companies of Japan
Video game development companies
Pokémon